John Comyn (c. 1150 – 25 October 1212), born in England, was Archbishop of Dublin, Ireland.

Life
He was chaplain to King Henry II of England and on his "urgent" recommendation was elected Archbishop of Dublin following the death of St. Laurence O'Toole in 1180. He had been a Benedictine monk at the Evesham Abbey.

In 1181, he was elected to the archbishopric of Dublin by some of the clergy of Dublin, who had assembled at Evesham for the purpose. He was not then a priest, but was subsequently, in the same year, ordained such, at Velletri, and on Palm Sunday (21 March) was there consecrated archbishop by Pope Lucius III. The following year the pope granted him manors and lands in and around Dublin, which subsequently formed the Manor of St. Sepulchre, which remained under the authority of the Archbishop of Dublin until the 19th century. The pope also, in an effort to protect the Dublin archbishopric from claims from Canterbury, extended certain privileges to Comyn, which intensified the rivalry between the sees of Dublin and Armagh for the Primacy of Ireland.

Comyn waited three years before visiting Ireland, until he was sent there by King Henry to prepare the reception of his son, Prince John. The king granted him lands and privileges which made him a Lord of Parliament. After his arrival in Ireland, John granted Comyn the Bishopric of Glendalough, with all its appurtenances in lands, manors, churches, tithes, fisheries and liberties, although Comyn never had an opportunity to take this up in his lifetime. Under Pope Urban III carried out a number of reforms of the Irish church to bring it into line with the church in England and in continental Europe.

In 1189, Archbishop Comyn assisted at the coronation of King Richard I. The following year he demolished the old parish church of St. Patrick, south of Dublin, and erected a new building, next to his Palace of St. Sepulchre, which he elevated to the status of a collegiate church, and which later became St. Patrick's Cathedral. This enabled him to rule in his own Liberty, without the interference of the mayor and citizens. About the same time he enlarged the choir of Christ Church Cathedral.

Prince John granted Comyn further legal rights throughout the country of Ireland, while Comyn also received the church and lands of All Hallows, to the northeast of Dublin. Between Lusk and Swords he founded the convent of Grace Dieu, which later became wealthy through grants from the Anglo-Norman prelates and magnates. However, when Hamo de Valoniis (alias de Valois), was appointed Justiciar of Ireland he seized some of these lands for the treasury (with a good portion for himself), and a dispute arose which caused Comyn to flee for his own safety to Normandy. Comyn appealed to Pope Innocent III, who settled the dispute, but John was angered by the actions of Comyn, and did not reconcile himself with him until 1206.

Comyn died six years later and was buried in Christ Church Cathedral, where a marble monument was erected to his memory. Two years later William Piro, Bishop of Glendalough, died, whereupon the union of the sees granted by King John took place.

Further reading
Sir John Gilbert, Crede Mihi (Dublin, 1897)
Sir John Gilbert, History of the City of Dublin (Dublin, 1859)
James Ware, ed. Walter Harris, Antiquities of Ireland (Dublin. 1764)
Moran, History of the Catholic Archbishops of Dublin (Dublin, 1864)

References

1150s births
1212 deaths
Archbishops of Dublin
12th-century Roman Catholic archbishops in Ireland
13th-century Roman Catholic archbishops in Ireland